Praśnavyākaranani is the tenth of the 12 Jain āgamas as per Śvetámbara tradition said to be promulgated by Māhavīra himself and composed by Ganadhara Sudharmaswami.
Praśnavyākaranani translated as “Questions and Explanations” discusses a variety of doctrinal matters concerning Jainism.

Subject matter of the Agama

The Agama contains information about the 5 Sins and conversely their Vows in Jainism. Namely Killing, Stealing, Lying, Unchastity (like Sexual Misconduct) and Possessiveness or Greed.

It talks about Killing and the results of Killing, the results (karma results) of Stealing, Lying, Unchastity and Possessiveness or Greed.

It then talks about Non-Killing, Non-Stealing, Non-Lying, Chastity and Non-Possessiveness or Non-Greed.

Jain texts
Agamas